Jean-Joseph Sourbader de Gimat was a volunteer French officer who served in the Continental Army during the American Revolutionary War. Born into a military family, he entered the French royal army in 1761. By 1776 he was a first lieutenant but went to America with Gilbert Motier, marquis de La Fayette with the promise of becoming a major. After serving as La Fayette's aide at Brandywine, Gloucester, Barren Hill, and Monmouth, he went back to France for one year. Returning to America in 1780, he was appointed to command a light infantry unit which fought at Green Spring in 1781. He led his men in a successful assault at Yorktown that same year. He returned to France in 1782 and was named colonel in command of a colonial regiment in Martinique. 

He later was governor of Saint Lucia from 1789 to 1792.

References

French soldiers
Continental Army officers from France
French military personnel of the American Revolutionary War
Governors of French Saint Lucia